Goliad State Park and Historic Site is a  state park located along the San Antonio River on the southern edge of Goliad, Texas. It was listed on the National Register of Historic Places (#01000258) on March 12, 2001.

Park 
The park features campsites, screened shelters, Group Hall and Chapel, an amphitheater, and the El Camino Real de los Tejas Visitors Center.

Historic sites 
Goliad area historic sites include:

 Reconstructed Mission Nuestra Señora del Espíritu Santo de Zúñiga;
 Ruins of Mission Nuestra Señora del Rosario;
 Reconstructed birthplace of Ignacio Zaragoza; and
 Fannin Memorial Monument, the burial site of James Fannin and the Goliad Massacre victims, by Raoul Josset, 1939.
 Presidio La Bahía.

See also

List of Texas state parks
List of Texas State Historic Sites
National Register of Historic Places listings in Goliad County, Texas
Recorded Texas Historic Landmarks in Goliad County

References

External links

Goliad State Park & Historic Site
The Look of Nature: Designing Texas State Parks During the Great Depression—Goliad
Home movie from the Baylor family of Goliad State Park on Texas Archive of the Moving Image

State parks of Texas
Protected areas of Goliad County, Texas
Civilian Conservation Corps in Texas
National Park Service rustic in Texas